PEC 215 is a proposed constitutional amendment to the constitution of Brazil.

It intends to delegate exclusively to Congress the duty of demarcation of indigenous and Quilombola territories, as well as the ratification of land already approved.
 
It would prohibit the expansion of already existing indigenous areas.
One of the proposal sections provides compensation of the Union to farmers who have properties absorbed by areas demarcated as indigenous land.
The Federal Constitution considers that indigenous lands belong to the Union and, therefore, there is no compensation to those who lose the ownership of the territory when the demarcation is recognized.

Currently, the government and Funai are responsible for demarcation. 
In the future, indigenous people might only be able to claim an area, they have lived in and used by 1988.
 
It would give Congress the final say on new demarcations, a fact that displeases the indigenous leaders because of the strength of lobbyists. 
Much of the protected area of indigenous territories are rain forests being important for water and climate.
There are farmers, who have filed an appeal.
PEC 215 has been approved by a parliamentary committee.
The proposal is being processed for 15 years in parliament.
Members of the Chamber of Deputies of
PT,
PCdoB, PV, PSOL and REDE were against the bill.

Approval of the bill depends on two rounds of voting in the plenary sessions of the Chamber of Deputies and the Federal Senate, with qualified quorum, that is, with the votes of at least 308 deputies and 49 senators. Parliamentarians opposed to the bill have said they will question its constitutionality in the Supreme Court.
The bill needs three fifths of the votes in senate to be approved. 
Great land owners have a great impact in congress.
Protests by indigenous people prevented a vote on PEC 215 in 2014.

Indigenous people have protested against the bill in front of the Chamber of Deputies.

References

Environmental law in Brazil
Proposed laws
Constitutional amendments
Brazilian constitutional law
2015 in politics
2015 in Brazil